United in Anger: A History of ACT UP is a 2012 documentary film directed by Jim Hubbard about the beginning and progress of the AIDS activist movement from the perspective of the people fighting the epidemic. Archival footage with oral histories of members of ACT UP depicts the history of civil disobedience against corporate greed, social indifference, and government negligence in the face of AIDS. Producers Jim Hubbard and Sarah Schulman created a documentary film that captures the efforts of ACT UP to remove the stigma associated with AIDS, fast track experimental drug research and testing, and provide a context for the devastating effects of the epidemic. Film includes several actions by ACT UP:  Seize Control of the FDA, Stop the Church, and Day of Desperation.

Synopsis
HIV arrives in the United States. People, mostly gay men, start dying. The US government ignores it. The Church condemns homosexuals. The Pharmaceutical industry produced expensive drugs.  People keep dying. Love, grief and outrage lead to the formation of ACT UP in March 1987. United in Anger: A History of ACT UP documents ACT UP's use of direct activism, civil disobedience, inroads and outroads to raise awareness and affect change on a national level.

Cast

Archival resources
 ACT UP Oral History Project

See also
 How to Survive a Plague: Documentary on the history of ACT UP

References

External links
 
  
 Review: United in Anger: A History of ACT UP in Variety

2012 films
2012 documentary films
Documentary films about HIV/AIDS
HIV/AIDS in American films
HIV/AIDS activism
Civil disobedience
American documentary films
2010s English-language films
2010s American films